Rogers Masson (born October 8, 1968) is an American record producer, engineer, mixer, and songwriter.  Masson is known for his ability to work seamlessly within different genres of music, and for his innovative approaches to recording.  He has produced and mixed albums for artists such as Day of Fire, Vintage Trouble, Lilyphone, and Song of America.  Masson has also written songs with artists such as Josh Brown of Day of Fire, and Chris Daughtry of Daughtry.  His latest project is Vintage Trouble’s The Bomb Shelter Deluxe UK.

It is from his studio, The Rog Mahal, in Nashville, TN, that Masson mixes most of his records.  He has also produced albums in the United Kingdom and Denmark.

Biography
Rogers Masson was born in Portsmouth, Virginia, and is the youngest of five children.  His mother, Margaret, who was born in Asheville, NC, was a nurse and descended from Jewish immigrants who came from Russia to Asheville, NC.  His father, Rogers Sr., was born in New Orleans, LA, and retired as a Naval officer who served for 20 years on nuclear ballistic missile submarines.  Masson’s father introduced him at an early age to artists such as The Platters, The Temptations, Otis Redding, Aretha Franklin, Ray Charles, The Beatles, The Beach Boys, Glen Campbell, Elton John, Neil Diamond, and The Moody Blues.  This early exposure formed a foundation of musical influences of which would be greatly broadened in his later years by his oldest brother Michael, who introduced him to Little Feat, The Who, Led Zeppelin, Pink Floyd, ZZ Top, AC/DC, Lynyrd Skynyrd, Meat Loaf, Fleetwood Mac, and Bob Seger.

Upon graduating high school in 1986, Masson joined the US Army where began his professional music career as a guitarist. He graduated from the Military School of Music, and returned to college once his tour of duty was complete.  In 1995 he earned a Bachelor of Arts in Music with a concentration in Electro-Acoustics from San Jose State University in San Jose, CA, and has been producing full-time ever since.

Masson opened the first fully digital studio in Central California called Carmel Digital.  There he produced a children’s album with Earthbound Farm called We're Next.  Later, he moved to Los Angeles, CA and worked with Snake (Dave Sabo) on Superfixx (Drain STH members) and also with  Marilyn Manson on 5.1 mix of the special features section of Guns, God and Government called The Death Parade.

In 2005, Masson moved to Nashville, TN. It was there he heard Day of Fire, and produced the Losing All album. He decided to go on the road with band, and co-wrote several songs with the band and with Chris Daughtry, of Daughtry. Their album reached #32, #26 Heatseaker, and their single reached #33 on Billboard's Top Hits.

Masson has also traveled to Denmark to work with Lilyphone.  Their album became album of the week on Danish National Radio.

Since 2010, he has been working with Vintage Trouble, first mixing The Bomb Shelter Sessions, then producing and mixing ten songs for their follow-up album.  They were quickly picked up and signed to management by Doc McGhee. His recent credits including mixing the upcoming debut album by Irish alternative pop band Riot Tapes.

Discography
 2010 Losing All — Day of Fire (producer)
 2010 The Bomb Shelter Sessions — Vintage Trouble (mixer)
 2010 Lilyphone — Lilyphone (producer/mixer/engineer)
 2007 Song of America — Song of America (mixer)
 2004 The Crickets and Their Buddies — The Crickets (mixer)
 2003 Theo Wilson Square — The Cribb (producer/mixer/engineer)
 2002 Guns, God and Government — Marilyn Manson (5.1 mixer/The Death Parade)

References

External links
 http://www.audreysound.com/

1968 births
Living people
Record producers from Virginia
Guitarists from Virginia
Musicians from Portsmouth, Virginia
20th-century American guitarists